Château-du-Loir (literally 'Château of the Loir') is a former commune in the Sarthe department in the region of Pays de la Loire in north-western France. On 1 October 2016, it was merged into the new commune Montval-sur-Loir. Château-du-Loir station has rail connections to Tours and Le Mans.

Notable people
Gervais II, lord of Château-du-Loir
Cécile Didier (1888–1975), stage and film actress
 Guillaume des Roches (1165 - 1222), lord of Longué-Jumelles and Château-du-Loir, comrade in arms of Philippe Auguste
 Saint Siméon-François Berneux (1814 - 1866), one of the Korean Martyrs
 Pierre Loutrel  (1916 - 1946), bandit

See also
Communes of the Sarthe department

References

Chateau-du-Loir
Maine (province)